Vaidehi is a 2009 Tamil language romance film directed by Gemini Raghava. The film stars Prithvi Rajan, Madhuchanda, Gemini Raghava and Karthika Adaikalam, with Dhandapani, Pallavi, Thadi Balaji, Kadhal Sukumar and Benjamin playing supporting roles. It was released on 6 November 2009.

Plot
Venkat (Prithvi Rajan) is a studious college student and son of the poor widow Parvathi (Pallavi). He stays in a hostel in the city with his classmates (Thadi Balaji and Kadhal Sukumar). Venkat is madly in love with his college mate Kavitha (Madhuchanda), daughter of the rich landlord Pannaiyar (Dhandapani), for two years. When Venkat declares his love to her, Kavitha, who absolutely detests the very thought of a young boy and girl falling in love, humiliates and insults him. She keeps avoiding Venkat, but he tries different ways to impress Kavitha. Kavitha then falls in love with him and accepts his love. After finishing their studies, the two lovers return to their respective village. One day, Parvathi witnesses them romancing in the ricefield and warns them about the danger of being in love.

In the past, Parvathi's brother Vettaikaaran (Gemini Raghava) worked in Pannaiyar's house. The village belle Vaidehi (Karthika Adaikalam), Pannaiyar's daughter, then declared her love to the naive Vettaikaaran, but Vettaikaaran could not believe her, and Vaidehi fainted. Vettaikaaran ran off in a panic with Vaidehi in his arms, and Pannaiyar stopped him and beat him up. Later, Vettaikaaran accepted her love, and Vaidehi made her brother accept for the wedding. When Vettaikaaran, Parvathi, and her husband Pazhani (Benjamin) came to ask Vaidehi in marriage in Pannaiyar's home, Pannaiyar, who was hell-bent to save his family's prestige at any cost, murdered Vaidehi and Pazhani. Pannaiyar then blamed Vettaikaaran for killing them, and Vettaikaaran went to jail.

Back to the present, Venkat and Kavitha decide to elope. Pannaiyar and his henchmen then catch them and hang them on a tree, but Vettaikaaran comes to their rescue and saves them. The fight culminates with Vettaikaaran and Pannaiyar teetering at the edge of a slippery cliff, and Pannaiyar ending up slipping. Vettaikaaran tries to save him but falls and dies.

The film ends with Venkat and Kavitha getting married with the blessings of Pannaiyar, who has now become a good person.

Cast

Prithvi as Venkat
Madhuchanda as Kavitha
Gemini Raghava as Vettaikaaran
Karthika as Vaidehi
Dhandapani as Pannaiyar
Pallavi as Parvathi, Venkat's mother
Kadhal Sukumar as Venkat's classmate
Thadi Balaji as Muruga
Kumarimuthu
Benjamin as Pazhani
Sethu Vinayagam as College Principal
Vadivelu Ganesh as Ganesh
Muthukaalai

Production
Director Gemini Raghava, who had also written the dialogues, screenplay, story and lyrics of the film, made his debut with this film. Actor Pandiarajan's son Prithvi Rajan who previously acted in Kaivantha Kalai (2006) and Naalaiya Pozhuthum Unnodu (2007) was selected to play the hero. Set in the village atmosphere, Thoothukudi fame Karthika and Madhuchanda, an actress from West Bengal, played the heroines in the film. K. Nithya took care of camera works while Srikanth Deva scored music for the film. The film director said, "The hero and heroine never meet and yet fall in love. That's the USP of this film". The film also had a comical song and dance number by Vadivelu Ganesh of Asatha Povathu Yaaru? fame.

Soundtrack

The film score and the soundtrack were composed by Srikanth Deva. The soundtrack, released in 2009, features 5 tracks with lyrics written by Gemini Raghava and Vadivelu Ganesh.

References

2009 films
2000s Tamil-language films
Indian romance films
Films scored by Srikanth Deva
2009 directorial debut films
2009 romance films